Joy Division was an English post-punk band, active 1976 to 1980, which took its name from the novel House of Dolls.

Joy Division may also refer to:

  ("Joy Division"), the name of the German camp brothels in World War II in the 1955 Israeli novel House of Dolls
 Kippumjo or "Joy Division," an alleged collective of females maintained by the head of state of North Korea for the purpose of providing pleasure and entertainment to officials
 Joy Division (2006 film), a 2006 film about a German teenager during World War II who later becomes a KGB spy
 Joy Division (2007 film), a 2007 documentary film about the band Joy Division
 "Joy Division", a song by English girl group Sugababes on the 2005 album Taller in More Ways
 "Joy Division" (2019), an episode of the TV series Goliath

See also
 Comfort women
 German camp brothels in World War II